Nancy Tang Chang (born 1950), née Tang Nanshan, is a biochemist who cofounded Tanox in 1986 to address medical needs in the areas of allergy, asthma, inflammation and diseases affecting the human immune system. Tanox took an innovative approach in developing an asthma drug that focused on the allergy-related basis of asthma, Xolair. In June 2003, the U.S. Food and Drug Administration (FDA) approved Xolair, the first biotech product cleared for treating those with asthma related to allergies. Tanox was also active in the development of TNX-355, an antibody for the treatment of HIV/AIDS. 
In 2007, Tanox was sold to Genentech for $919 million. Dr. Chang grew Tanox from an idea to a substantial publicly traded company, doing innovative science. Following her success with Tanox, she has become an angel investor in health-care entrepreneurships and performs philanthropic work in community health-education projects.

Biography
Nancy Chang was born in Taiwan in 1950. Her parents were from mainland China, and had traveled to Taiwan after their marriage. Due to political unrest in China, they were not allowed to return, and stayed in Taiwan. Nancy attended Taipei First Girls' High School in Taipei, where "we were trained to compete with the boys". She studied college chemistry the first year in high school and college physics the second year.

Nancy attended Taiwan's National Tsing Hua University, where she took undergraduate classes from future Nobel Prize winner Yuan T. Lee.  There she also met a fellow budding scientist, Tse Wen Chang. They married just a few days before traveling to the United States, where both had received scholarships for graduate school: Nancy at Brown University and Tse Wen at Harvard University. On the plane ride to the United States, Nancy read James Watson’s book on the discovery of the double helix. This sparked her interest in biology, which she had not previously studied. Nancy subsequently changed her academic focus to biology and transferred to the Division of Medical Sciences, Harvard University.  The Changs were among the first international students at the Division of Medical Sciences, and Nancy had to work extremely hard due to her unfamiliarity with English. Nancy earned her Ph.D. in biological chemistry from Harvard University.

Work
Her interest in interferon led her to approach Dr. Sidney Pestka at Roche Pharmaceutical Company and be hired at Hoffman-La Roche. For a time, the Changs endured the difficulties of a commuter marriage: Nancy lived and worked in Parsippany, NY; Tse Wen commuted to Pennsylvania each week to work at Centocor.  Eventually Nancy joined Centocor as a bench-level diagnostician. Her heart was still in research, and she took part in Centocor's involvement in therapeutic research. She brought in several new projects, including HIV/AIDS research.  Nancy's team participated in a consortium, which sequenced the HIV genome structure. Nancy was instrumental in developing the first diagnostic assay to detect HIV infection by employing a peptide segment of HIV as the solid-phase antigen in the immunoassay.  She was Director of Research at Centocor from 1982 to 1986.

In 1986, the Changs moved to Houston, TX.  Baylor College of Medicine in Houston offered Tse Wen a faculty position, and Nancy was able to obtain a position as well.  She became Associate Professor of Virology at Baylor College of Medicine, serving from 1986 to 1991.

Both Nancy and Tse Wen suffered severely from allergies.  Tse Wen had an idea for treating allergies by blocking IgE (immunoglobulin E), and the Changs founded the biotechnology company Tanox. Tse Wen continued his preferred work as a professor, and Nancy served as president of the new company. In 1992, the Changs separated. Tse Wen returned to Taiwan in 1996 to teach, while remained as a board member of Tanox until the company was acquired by Genentech. Nancy continued her work with Tanox, serving as CEO as well as president.

Tanox focused on addressing medical needs in the areas of allergy, asthma, inflammation, and diseases affecting the human immune system, developing an asthma drug that targeted the allergy-related basis of asthma, Xolair. 
Tanox's initial public offering in 2000 was the second largest IPO ever for a biotechnology company, raising $244 million. In June 2003, the U.S. Food and Drug Administration (FDA) approved Xolair, the first biotech product cleared for treating those with asthma related to allergies.  In 2007, Tanox was sold to Genentech for $919 million. Nancy continued to be involved, as chairman of Tanox's board of directors.

Tanox was also active in the development of TNX-355, an antibody for the treatment of HIV/AIDS. Nancy has said that she is passionate about AIDS because of her work as a young researcher in one of the first laboratories to confront the disease.

Nancy Chang's published research includes over 35 papers on topics including monoclonal antibodies and HIV.  She has been awarded seven patents.

Chang has served on the boards of directors of the Federal Reserve Bank in Houston, of BioHouston, of Project Hope, of Charles River Laboratories, and of the Board of Visitors of the University of Texas M.D. Anderson Cancer Center, among others. Nancy is an angel investor in health-care entrepreneurships and performs philanthropic work in community health-education projects. As part of Project Hope's China programs, she has had the responsibility of assessing annual progress in programs at Wuhan University School of Medicine, Shanghai Children's Medical Center, and educational programs and treatments for diabetes and HIV/AIDS. As of 2009, Dr. Chang was the chairman and managing director of OrbiMed's Caduceus Asia partner fund and a member of Orbimed Advisors, the largest investment firm focused entirely on the healthcare sector. As of 2013, Nancy Chang was president of Apex Enterprises.

Honors and awards
During her career, Dr. Chang has received numerous academic, national and international awards for her leadership and contributions to the biopharmaceutical industry.

Nancy Chang was inducted into the Texas Science Hall of Fame in 2001, for exemplary achievement in science.

In 2005, she was named a Most Respected Woman in Biotechnology (MedAd News, 2005), and also received the Global Business Achievement Hall of Fame Governor's Award from the Global Federation of Chinese Business Women in the Southern U.S.

In 2008 Nancy was named to the Forbes Twenty-Five Notable Chinese Americans list.

In 2012, she became the first woman to receive the 14th annual Biotechnology Heritage Award, conferred by the Biotechnology Industry Organization (BIO) and the Chemical Heritage Foundation.

She is the recipient of several additional awards, such as the Association of Women in Computing: Top 20 Houston Women in Technology and Houston Entrepreneur of the Year.

References

External links
Nancy Chang, Video, 15 min 35 sec, from  Women in Chemistry, at the Science History Institute, Philadelphia, PA

1950 births
Living people
Harvard Graduate School of Arts and Sciences alumni
Taiwanese biochemists
Taiwanese company founders
Taiwanese emigrants to the United States
Taiwanese women company founders
Women biochemists
Taiwanese women scientists
20th-century American businesswomen
20th-century American businesspeople
21st-century American businesswomen
21st-century American businesspeople
20th-century Taiwanese scientists
National Tsing Hua University alumni